Herbert Charles Dummett (9 January 1891 – 4 May 1976) was an Australian rules footballer who played with Collingwood in the Victorian Football League (VFL).

Family
The son of Henry Peter James Dummett (1857-1921), and Jessie Adeline Dummett (1856-1928), née Rouse, Charlie Dummett was born in Brunswick on 9 January 1891.

He was the brother of Collingwood footballer Alf Dummett, and of Victorian cricketer Arthur Dummett (1900-1968).

He married Amy Dorothy Bertram (1895-1974) in 1916.

Footballer
Dummett made three appearances for Collingwood in the 1909 VFL season, as an 18-year-old. He did not play at all in 1910, a Collingwood premiership season; and in 1911 he played just one senior game.

Although his brother, Alf Dummett, was also at Collingwood at that time, they never played together.

Goal umpire
From 1927 to 1945, Dummett goal umpired 264 VFL matches, the most ever by a former player. He officiated in the 1933 and 1943 VFL Grand Finals.

Death
He died on 4 May 1976.

Footnotes

References
 AFLUA: Herbert Dummett

External links
 Boyles Football photos: Charlie Dummett.
 
 AFL Tables: Charlie Dummett

1891 births
Collingwood Football Club players
Australian Football League umpires
Australian rules footballers from Melbourne
1976 deaths
People from Brunswick, Victoria